Xiahuayuan District is a district of the city of Zhangjiakou, Hebei province, China.

Administrative divisions

Subdistricts:
Chengzhen Subdistrict, Meikuang Subdistrict

Townships:
Huayuan Township, Xinzhuangzi Township, Dingfangshui Township, Duanjiabu Township

References

External links
 http://www.xhyggzy.com/ Official Website

County-level divisions of Hebei
Zhangjiakou